The Good Soldier Schweik is a 1926 Czech black-and-white silent era comedy film directed by Karel Lamač, based on Jaroslav Hašek's novel The Good Soldier Švejk. The first of the Czech films starring Karel Noll, as the Good Soldier Švejk. Of these, it was the most closely based on the original, unfinished novel. Subsequent films continued the original story.

Cast 
 Karel Noll as Josef Švejk
 Antonie Nedošinská as Mrs. Müllerová
 Karel Lamač as Innkeeper Palivec / Lt. Lukáš
 Jan W. Speerger as Bretschneider
 Betty Kysilková as Mrs. Palivcová

Sequels 

 Schweik at the Front (1926) 
 Schweik in Russian Captivity (1926) 
 Schweik in Civilian Life (1927) 

A 76-minute cut of the first 3 films edited by Martin Frič, was released as The Fates of the Good Soldier Švejk in 1930.

References

External links
 

1920s Czech-language films
Czechoslovak black-and-white films
The Good Soldier Švejk
Films based on Czech novels
Films based on works by Jaroslav Hašek
1926 films
Czech silent films
Czech World War I films